The Ruff and Reddy Show is a comic book series written by Howard Chaykin, with art by Mac Rey. Based on The Ruff and Reddy Show created by Hanna-Barbera, the series reimagines Ruff and Reddy as stand-up comedians in the 1950s. The first issue was published by DC Comics on October 25, 2017.

Reception
According to review aggregator Comic Book Roundup, the series scored an average of 7.2/10 based on 24 reviews.

References

Comics based on television series
Hanna-Barbera comics
Comics about cats
Comics about dogs
Comics set in the 1950s
Satirical comics
DC Comics titles
Humor comics
2017 comics debuts